Bodsworth may refer to:

Fred Bodsworth (1918–2012), Canadian writer, journalist, and naturalist
Vic Bodsworth (1931–1967), Australian rules footballer

See also